Earl Dennison Woods (March 5, 1932 – May 3, 2006) was the father of American professional golfer Tiger Woods. Woods started his son in golf at a very early age and coached him exclusively over his first years in the sport. He later published two books about the process.

He was previously a U.S. Army infantry officer who served two tours of duty in South Vietnam and retired with the rank of lieutenant colonel. He was also a college baseball player. His granddaughter, Cheyenne Woods, is also a professional golfer.

Early life
Woods was born in Manhattan, Kansas. His father, Miles Woods, had five children by his first wife, Viola, and six more (of whom Earl was the youngest) by his second, Maude Carter. Miles Woods was an epileptic who worked as a street cleaner and caretaker. Although his father was a devout Baptist, he also had a reputation for being able to swear for 30 minutes without interruption. Woods once remarked, "I picked up on that." His father was African-American and his mother, Maude (Carter) Woods, was of mixed African and European ancestry and was lighter-skinned.

The skin tone of Woods's siblings ranged from fairly dark to very light; he remembered that his grandmother Carter, who was of mixed race, was "the prettiest blonde you ever saw." There was a family joke about an alleged Chinese ancestor who "didn't stay on his railroad job," but there is no record of any Chinese ancestry. However, the family is said to have some Native American ancestry. Miles Woods loved baseball, and passed his passion on to his son. Maude Woods, who was college educated, was determined that her children should make the best of themselves. When her husband died in 1943, however, she had to go to work as a maid. Woods recalled that it "broke her heart." Maude Woods died when Earl was 15, and he was raised from then on by his older sister, Hattie Bell Woods. He graduated from Manhattan High School in 1949.

College, sports, and segregation
Woods attended Kansas State University (then known as Kansas State College) and played baseball, earning a varsity letter in both 1952 and 1953.

His teammate Larry Hartshorn recalled how Woods once was not allowed to play at a college in Mississippi because of his race. The entire Kansas State baseball team refused to play and left in protest.

Woods broke the Big Eight Conference (then the Big Seven Conference) "color barrier" in baseball in 1951. He usually played as a catcher, and was offered a contract by the Kansas City Monarchs of the Negro leagues. However, he decided to continue his education, graduated in 1953 with a BS in sociology, and was commissioned as an officer in the U.S. Army.

Mid life

Military career
Woods served two combat tours during the Vietnam War, the first as an infantry officer and the second with the United States Army Special Forces.

After graduating from the Defense Information School and being promoted to lieutenant colonel, he was assigned as an instructor of Military Science & Tactics, (Army ROTC) at the City College of New York. He retired from active duty in 1974.

Woods moved to Southern California, and became an employee of McDonnell Douglas Corp in Huntington Beach, California.

Marriages
Woods married Barbara Gary on May 18, 1954, in Abilene, Kansas. They had three children: Earl Dennison Jr. (1955), Kevin Dale (1957), and Royce Renee (1961). Earl Jr.'s daughter Cheyenne Woods is also a professional golfer, and received some coaching from Earl Sr.

Woods and his wife divorced in 1968 in Ciudad Juárez, Mexico.

Woods had met his second wife, Kultida Punsawad, while stationed in Thailand in 1966. Punsawad is half Thai, a quarter Dutch and a quarter Chinese. They married in 1969 in Brooklyn, New York. Their son Eldrick was born in 1975. His son's nickname, Tiger, comes from Woods' wartime friendship with Lieutenant Colonel Vuong Dang "Tiger" Phong, an officer who served in the Army of the Republic of Vietnam.

Teaching golf to his son
In 1972, Woods was stationed at Brooklyn's Fort Hamilton, and learned to play golf, starting at age 42, at the Dyker Beach Golf Course in Dyker Heights. From his first experience with golf, Woods was captivated by it, and played a great deal for the remainder of his life. He eventually became a good standard amateur golfer, often scoring in the 70s for 18 holes. Woods claimed to be playing close to scratch handicap level when his son Tiger was born in late 1975. Coached by his father, Tiger Woods was introduced to golf in Orange County, California before age two, and became a child prodigy in golf, perhaps the most precocious young golfer in history. Tiger learned golf first on the U.S. military courses in southern California.

Woods shared the techniques he used in coaching his son Tiger in two books: Training a Tiger: A Father's Guide to Raising a Winner in Both Golf and Life, and Playing Through: Straight Talk on Hard Work, Big Dreams and Adventures with Tiger. Woods coached Tiger exclusively until age five, then sought professional assistance from Rudy Duran and John Anselmo, both well-regarded PGA club professionals in the area. In 1993, following Tiger's third straight title in the USGA Junior Amateur Championship, his father sought out superstar teacher Butch Harmon to develop Tiger's game further. Harmon, upon meeting Tiger for the first time in Houston in summer 1993, praised the coaching which his father, Duran, and Anselmo had undertaken to that point.

Woods retired from his second career working at McDonnell Douglas in Huntington Beach, California in 1988. He traveled to Tiger's events as often as possible for the rest of his life. Woods hired Connecticut attorney John Merchant in 1996 to help facilitate the path for Tiger to turn professional, and to secure lucrative sponsorship agreements when he did so. Merchant had been the first African American member of the United States Golf Association's Executive Committee. Tiger signed deals with Nike, Titleist, and the International Management Group, which made him a multi-millionaire as soon as he declared professional status in late August 1996. Tiger's deals broke by a wide margin all records for sponsorship money in golf. Soon after Tiger turned professional, Merchant was fired by Earl Woods.

Illnesses and death
Woods was diagnosed with prostate cancer in 1998. He died from a heart attack at his home in Cypress, California in 2006 at the age of 74. He was buried at Sunset Cemetery in Manhattan, Kansas.

The Earl Woods National Youth Golf Academy at Colbert Hills Golf Course in Manhattan, Kansas is named in his honor. It was host to the first First Tee National Academy in 2000.

Posthumous Nike commercial
On April 8, 2010, Nike released a television commercial, created by the Wieden + Kennedy ad agency, featuring the somber face of Tiger Woods (depicted in black and white) and the voice of Earl Woods. The audio track of the commercial was taken from a 2004 interview of Earl for the documentary DVD Tiger: The Authorized DVD Collection, in which Earl discussed comparing the "authoritative" nature of his wife, Kultida, to his own "inquisitive" nature. The commercial utilized a sound bite from that interview as a backdrop to the camera capture of Tiger's face, and it was widely interpreted as a skewing of Earl's words to posthumously address Tiger's own marital issues, which had recently come to light; the commercial was released on the same day that Tiger had made his anticipated return to competition at the Masters Tournament following a five-month self-imposed absence during the resulting public fallout, and was the first to feature Tiger's participation since the scandal broke.

Reactions to the commercial varied widely, with criticisms being particularly leveled at Nike for utilizing Tiger's own domestic issues for commercial gain and plaudits being forwarded to Tiger for addressing how the scandal had affected him both in private and public life.

Military awards
Parachutist Badge
Bronze Star Medal
Army Commendation Medal
Army of Occupation Medal
National Defense Service Medal with oak leaf cluster
Armed Forces Expeditionary Medal
Vietnam Service Medal
Armed Forces Reserve Medal with hour glass device
Vietnam Cross of Gallantry
Republic of Vietnam Campaign Medal

References

External links
Interview with Earl Woods in Golf Digest
Earl Woods National Youth Golf Academy
Tiger Woods' statement on the death of Earl Woods

Chicago Tribune story on Woods' death
Earl Woods' Other Children

African-American baseball players
United States Army personnel of the Vietnam War
Deaths from cancer in California
Deaths from prostate cancer
Golf writers and broadcasters
20th-century American male writers
Kansas State Wildcats baseball players
Writers from Manhattan, Kansas
United States Army colonels
1932 births
2006 deaths
20th-century African-American writers
21st-century African-American people
African-American male writers